Lee Yong-gill is a former delegate of the Labor Party in South Korea.

See also 
 Hong Sehwa

External links 
  

1954 births
Living people
People from Seoul
New Progressive Party (South Korea) politicians
Leaders of the Labor Party (South Korea)
Democratic Labor Party (South Korea) politicians